Vietnam has 22 military schools training officers for all branches, agencies, units belongs to the Ministry of Defence (Vietnam). Which has 19 schools enroll high school-level institutions, non-commissioned officers and soldiers. National Defense Academy of Vietnam in Hanoi only enrolls military officers have graduated from the Military Academy in middle level. Dalat Army Academy enrolls officers just graduated from officer school. Political Academy in Ha Dong only enrolls officers have graduated from the Political Officer School and the Officer Academies and other institutions in the military.

Organizationally, there are 06 main Academies and 02 Army Officer Universities belongs to the Ministry of Defence (Vietnam); other schools made regular members of the General Department, the Branches, the Arms and Border Defense Force command.

Depend on the responsibilities, duties and training officers on the scale and properties of military warfare that the Vietnamese Military Academies are assigned as follows:

 National Defense Academy is a high-ranking military academy to trains campaign-strategy level officers;
 The rest are middle-ranking military academy to train officers for the campaign, tactical team-army soldiers;
 The Officers schools are primary to train officers for tactical team (platoon, company, battalion).

List of Academies

High-ranking (Strategy level)
National Defense Academy of Vietnam

Middle-ranking (Campaign level)
Vietnam Military Academy, Dalat
Vietnam Military Political Academy
Military Technical Academy or Le Quy Don Technical University
Air Defense and Air Forces Academy
Vietnam Border Defense Force Academy
Military Logistics Academy or Military Academy of Logistics
Military Science Academy
Vietnam Military Medical University Le Huu Trac Medical University
Vietnam Naval Academy
Cryptography Techniques Academy or Academy of Cryptography Techniques
1st Army Officer School or Tran Quoc Tuan University
2nd Army Officer School or Nguyen Hue University
Military Political Officer School or Military Political University

Tactic level
Artillery Officer School or Military College of Artillery
Chemistry Officer School or Military College of Chemical Forces
Special Forces Officer School or Military College of Special Forces
Information Officer School or Telecommunication University
Military Engineer Officer School or Ngo Quyen University
Tank and Armored Officer School or Military College of Tank and Armored
Military University of Culture and Arts
Vietnam Air Force Officer School

Other
Military Engineering Officer School Vinhempich or Tran Dai Nghia University
Viettel Academy
National Military Industry College
Technology and Vehicle Techniques College
1st Military Logistics College
2nd Military Logistics College
Reconnaissance College
Naval Techniques College
Air Defense and Air Force Techniques College
Cryptography Techniques College
Information Techniques College
Ordinance Technical Intermediate School
Middle Vietnam Technical Intermediate School
Military Engineer Techniques Intermediate School
Tank and Armored Techniques Intermediate School
Cryptography Techniques Intermediate School
1st Border Defense Force Intermediate School
2nd Border Defense Force Intermediate School
24th Border Defense Force Intermediate School

See also
 Military academies (includes list)

External links
Hơn 4.000 chỉ tiêu vào các trường Quân đội năm 2009
Những điều cần biết khi dự thi vào khối các trường quân đội
Khâu xét tuyển khối các trường quân đội như thế nào?
Trường quân đội tuyển sinh thế nào? 
Đổi mới nội dung, chương trình và phương pháp dạy học
Chọn đường binh nghiệp
Hệ quân sự khối các trường quân đội đào tạo gì?
Chuẩn bị đào tạo cao học quân sự tại Trường sĩ quan Lục quân 2
Điểm chuẩn các trường khối quân sự, công an năm 2006
Điểm chuẩn của các trường thuộc khối quân sự năm 2007
Về hệ thống các học viện quân sự, trường đại học và trường cao đẳng quân sự năm 1982

References 

Military of Vietnam
Universities in Vietnam
Military academies of Vietnam